Haplochrois albanica is a species of moth of the family Elachistidae. It is found in southern and central Europe.

The wingspan is 11–12 mm. Adults have been recorded from June to August.

The food plant is unknown.

References

External links
Lepiforum e. V.

Moths described in 1932
Elachistidae
Moths of Europe